Southwood Acres is a suburban neighborhood within the town of Enfield in northern Hartford County, Connecticut, United States. The neighborhood is listed as a census-designated place (CDP) by the U.S. Census Bureau and had a population of 7,657 at the 2010 census.

Geography
Southwood Acres generally refers to the area between Interstate 91 in the west and the Scantic River in the east, and between the East Windsor town line in the south and South Road in the north.

Demographics
As of the census of 2000, there were 8,067 people, 2,988 households, and 2,414 families residing in the CDP. The racial makeup of the CDP was 96.48% White, 0.95% African American, 0.06% Native American, 0.83% Asian, 0.73% from other races, and 0.94% from two or more races. Hispanic or Latino of any race were 1.60% of the population.

There were 2,988 households, out of which 33.8% had children under the age of 18 living with them, 68.9% were married couples living together, 8.9% had a female householder with no husband present, and 19.2% were non-families. 16.2% of all households were made up of individuals, and 7.6% had someone living alone who was 65 years of age or older.  The average household size was 2.70 and the average family size was 3.02.

In the CDP, the population was spread out, with 24.6% under the age of 18, 5.4% from 18 to 24, 29.0% from 25 to 44, 26.3% from 45 to 64, and 14.6% who were 65 years of age or older.  The median age was 40 years. For every 100 females, there were 94.9 males.  For every 100 females age 18 and over, there were 91.6 males.

The median income for a household in the CDP was $60,743, and the median income for a family was $64,930. Males had a median income of $46,530 versus $30,984 for females. The per capita income for the CDP was $23,891.  About 1.8% of families and 2.4% of the population were below the poverty line, including 0.6% of those under age 18 and 3.2% of those age 65 or over.

References

Enfield, Connecticut
Census-designated places in Hartford County, Connecticut
Neighborhoods in Connecticut
Census-designated places in Connecticut